Reo Wilde (born October 6, 1973, in Pocatello, Idaho) is an American athlete, who competes in compound archery. He took up archery in 1992 and first represented the United States senior team in 1995, and has since won many World Cup and World Championships titles. As at October 2013 he is the number two ranked compound archer in the world.

References

1973 births
Living people
American male archers
World Archery Championships medalists
World Games gold medalists
Competitors at the 2013 World Games
World Games medalists in archery